Bartholomew Joseph Eustace (October 9, 1887 – December 11, 1956) was an American prelate of the Catholic Church. He served as the first bishop of the Diocese of Camden in New Jersey from 1938 until his death.

Biography

Early life 
Bartholomew Eustace was born October 9, 1887, on the Lower East Side of Manhattan in New York City. He was the elder of two sons of Bartholomew Ambrose and Elizabeth (née Nolan) Eustace, both natives of Ireland. His father worked as a bookkeeper.

Eustace graduated from St. Francis Xavier College in 1910. He then began his studies for the priesthood at St. Joseph's Seminary in Yonkers. He won a scholarship to Rome, where he completed his theological studies at the Pontifical North American College and earned a doctorate in theology.

Priesthood 
While studying in Rome, Eustace was ordained a priest for the Archdiocese of New York on November 1, 1914, by Bishop Alessio Ascalesi. Upon his return to New York the following summer, Eustace was appointed an assistant pastor at Blessed Sacrament Parish in New Rochelle. He remained there for one year before joining the faculty of St. Joseph's Seminary in 1916 as professor of philosophy and liturgy. During World War I, Eustace also served as a chaplain at the Pelham Bay Naval Training Station in New York City.

At St. Joseph's, Eustace earned a reputation as a liturgical scholar, publishing an English translation of Pope Benedict XIII's Memoriale Rituum in 1935 and often serving as master of ceremonies to Cardinal Patrick Hayes. Among his students was James McIntyre, who would become a cardinal in 1953. Eustace remained at the seminary for 21 years, until he was appointed pastor at Blessed Sacrament Parish in New Rochelle in September 1937.

Bishop of Camden 
On December 16, 1937, Eustace was appointed the first bishop of the newly-established Diocese of Camden by Pope Pius XI. He received his episcopal consecration on March 25, 1938, from Cardinal Hayes, with Bishops Edward Kelly and Stephen Donahue serving as co-consecrators, at St. Patrick's Cathedral in New York City. More than 3,000 guests attended his consecration, including former New York Governor Al Smith, former New York City Mayor John P. O'Brien, and Eustace's elderly mother. Following his arrival in Camden, Eustace said he believed his mother "was just a little proud of me, now that I am a bishop." Eustace took formal charge of the Diocese of Camden on May 4, 1938, when he was installed at Cathedral of the Immaculate Conception. 

The new diocese, comprising six counties and 2,700 square miles in South Jersey, then contained 100,000 Catholics, 86 priests, 49 parishes, and 35 Catholic schools. Over the course of Eustace's 18 years as bishop, the Catholic population and the number of priests in the diocese more than doubled. He founded 31 parishes, 25 missions, 50 churches, 20 convents, 22 elementary schools, and four high schools.

Two of the parishes that Eustace founded were established specifically for African-American Catholics — St. Monica's in Atlantic City (the first new parish during his tenure) and St. Bartholomew's in Camden. When St. Bartholomew's fell into financial difficulties, Eustace recruited Eddie Cantor to give a benefit performance in 1950. He also erected Our Lady of Fatima Parish for Spanish-speaking Catholics. Eustace established Our Lady of Lourdes Hospital at Camden in 1950 and Mercy Hospital at Sea Isle City, New Jersey, in 1953, as well as the Angelus Convalescent Home at Wildwood, New Jersey, and St. Mary's Home for the Aged at Haddonfield, New Jersey.

Eustace was diagnosed with diabetes in 1941 and had three heart attacks between 1950 and 1955.

Death 
He was diagnosed with bladder cancer in September 1956, after which he became confined to his residence in Haddonfield. He died there on December 11, 1956, at age 69.

His funeral Mass was celebrated by his former student, Cardinal McIntyre of Los Angeles. He is buried at Calvary Cemetery in Cherry Hill.

Legacy
Bishop Eustace Preparatory School, a coeducational private high school in Pennsauken Township, New Jersey, is named in his honor.

References

1887 births
1956 deaths
People from Camden, New Jersey
People from Collingswood, New Jersey
People from Haddonfield, New Jersey
Saint Joseph's Seminary (Dunwoodie) alumni
American Roman Catholic clergy of Irish descent
20th-century Roman Catholic bishops in the United States
People from the Lower East Side
Burials in New Jersey
Catholics from New York (state)
Catholics from New Jersey